Anomoeotes instabilis is a species of moth of the Anomoeotidae family. It is known from Cameroon.

References

Endemic fauna of Cameroon
Anomoeotidae
Insects of Cameroon
Moths of Africa
Moths described in 1929